The Australia–China trade war is an ongoing trade war between Australia and China.

The exact date of when the trade war began is debated, however it is understood it began in either 2017 or 2018.

Sanctions
In 2020, China gradually imposed several trade sanctions on Australia. A wide range of Australian products were sanctioned, including barley, beef, cotton, lamb, lobsters, timber and wine.

Triggers

2020
In early 2020, Prime Minister Scott Morrison endorsed an inquiry into the origins of COVID-19, which angered China. Following this, China started posing import tariffs on some Australian exports. According to analysts, these sanctions were a retaliation for the endorsement. Australia had also imposed anti-dumping tariffs on some Chinese exports.

Zhao Lijian, Chinese foreign ministry spokesman, tweeted a doctored photo of an Australian soldier holding a bloody knife to the throat of an Afghan child who is holding a lamb, in response to allegations of war crimes committed by Australian soldiers in Afghanistan. Australia urged China to apologise and for the tweet to be taken down.

2021
China continued to further sanction Australia in 2021. Another major trigger was the AUKUS agreement between Australia, the United Kingdom and the United States. In December, Australia joined the US-led diplomatic boycott of the 2022 Beijing Winter Olympics, which were held in February 2022, due to human rights abuses in China.

2022
On 23 May 2022, the Indo-Pacific Economic Framework (IPEF) was formed by US President Joe Biden. The new alliance has 14 members; 13 founding members (Australia, Brunei, India, Indonesia, Japan, Malaysia, New Zealand, the Philippines, Singapore, South Korea, Thailand and Vietnam) and one later entry (Fiji). It is believed that the alliance was formed in response to the security deal between China and the Solomon Islands, which was signed earlier that year. Chinese Foreign Minister Wang Yi heavily criticised the new alliance. Leading up to the 2022 Australian federal election, China was accused of interfering with the election and with the goal of the Australian Labor Party winning the election and defeating the Liberal-National Coalition.

Bans on Chinese products
In 2018, Australia banned Chinese telecommunications companies Huawei and ZTE.

See also
 China-United States trade war

References

Trade wars
Australia–China relations